Manos Tsangaris (born 8 December 1956) is a German composer, musician, sound art installation and performance artist, and a poet.

Life 
Born in Düsseldorf, Tsangaris studied at the Hochschule für Musik und Tanz Köln from 1976 to 1983 composition with Mauricio Kagel and percussion with Christoph Caskel, and at the Kunstakademie Düsseldorf with Alfonso Hüppi. Since 1980, he has participated several times in the Darmstädter Ferienkurse for Neue Musik and worked for the Münchner Kammerspiele. In 1991, he was invited by the Soviet composers' association as artist-in-residence in Moscow, in the same year he received the Bernd Alois Zimmermann scholarship from the city of Cologne, in 1992/93, the scholarship at the Akademie Schloss Solitude and in 1997 the art prize of the Akademie der Künste (AdK) Berlin, of which he has been a member since 2009. In the same year, he received the Orchestra Prize of the Donaueschinger Musiktage for his piece Batsheba. Eat the History. Since 2012, he is head of the AdK section music. In 2017, he was elected full member of the Bayerische Akademie der Schönen Künste in the music section.

Since the 1970s, Tsangaris has published poems, performed as a soloist and with various music groups (including Ritim Grup and MIR) and exhibited drawings, theatre machinery and sound installations. He participated in festivals such as Cologne–New York in New York (1989), Ars Electronica in Linz (1991), Linz; "Sound Ways" in Saint Petersburg (1995), "Yokohama Arts" (1997) and the "Musica-Festival Strasbourg" (1998).

Tsangaris has composed works commissioned by the Westdeutscher Rundfunk, the Südwestrundfunk, the Bayerische Staatsoper, the Kölner Philharmonie, the Diözesanmuseum Köln, the Kunststiftung Nordrhein-Westfalen, the Katholisches Bildungswerk Köln and the city of Witten. He is also active as a percussionist; he plays with Jaki Liebezeit and other percussionists in the improvisation ensemble .

In 2009, he was appointed professor of composition at the Hochschule für Musik Dresden. In 2015 he was a scholarship holder at the Villa Massimo in Rome. In 2016, Tsangaris took over the artistic direction of the Munich Biennale together with the Swiss composer Daniel Ott (as successor to Peter Ruzicka).

Publications
 Stille Post. Gedichte. Thürmchen Verlag Köln 1986
 3x8 Zeichnungen und 14 Gedichte (with ). Thürmchen Verlag Cologne 1990
 Mundmaßung. Gedichte. Edition Solitude 1995
 Die kleine Trance. Gedichte. Radius Verlag 2002
 Werkbuch Manos Tsangaris. Werkbuch zum Implodierenden Schreibtisch. KOLUMBA Werkhefte und Bücher 2011/2014
 Unbekannte Empfänger. Gedichte. Radius Verlag 2017

Further reading 
 Jörn Peter Hiekel: "Permanent Quest: The Processional Theatre of Manos Tsangaris". In Matthias Rebstock and David Roesner (eds.): Composed Theatre: Aesthetics, Practices, Processes. Intellect Verlag, Bristol 2012, 
 Ulrich Tadday (ed.): Musik-Konzepte Sonderband Manos Tsangaris. , Munich 2015,

References

External links 
 
 

German percussionists
20th-century classical composers
Members of the Academy of Arts, Berlin
1956 births
Living people
Musicians from Düsseldorf